Tao Yuan (born 18 January 1993 in Anqing, Anhui) is a Chinese footballer who plays for Sichuan Jiuniu in the China League One.

Club career
Tao Yuan started his football career with Jiangsu Sainty during the 2014 season   after playing for Jiangsu Youth during the 2011 season   and the 2012 season. On 15 July 2014, Tao made his debut for Jiangsu Sainty in the third round of 2014 Chinese FA Cup which Jiangsu beat Hunan Billows 2–1. Tao made his Super League debut fours days later, in a 3–2 defeat against Guangzhou R&F. He scored his first goal for Jiangsu on 23 July 2014, which ensured Jiangsu Sainty beat Lijiang Jiayunhao 2–1.

Career statistics
Statistics accurate as of match played 31 December 2020.

Honours

Club
Jiangsu Sainty
Chinese FA Cup: 2015

References

External links
 

1993 births
Living people
Chinese footballers
Footballers from Anhui
Jiangsu F.C. players
China League Two players
Chinese Super League players
Footballers at the 2014 Asian Games
Association football midfielders
Asian Games competitors for China